The economy of Luxembourg is largely dependent on the banking, steel, and industrial sectors. Luxembourgers enjoy the highest per capita gross domestic product in the world, according to an IMF estimate in 2022.

Although Luxembourg in tourist literature is aptly called the "Green Heart of Europe", its pastoral land coexists with a highly industrialized and export-intensive area. Luxembourg's economy is quite similar to Germany's. Luxembourg enjoys a degree of economic prosperity very rare among industrialized democracies.

In 2009, a budget deficit of 5% resulted from government measures to stimulate the economy, especially the banking sector, as a result of the Great Recession. This was however reduced to 1.4% in 2010.

For 2017 the (expected) figures are as follows:  Growth 4.6%; Inflation 1.0%; Budget deficit 1.7%, to be reduced to 0.8% in 2020; Debt: 20.4%, no new debts to be taken in the fiscal year.

Sectors
In 2013 the GDP was $60.54 billion of which services, including the financial sector, produced 86%. The financial sector comprised 36% of GDP, industry comprised 13.3% and agriculture only 0.3%.

Banking

Banking is the largest sector in the Luxembourg economy. In the 2019 Global Financial Centres Index, Luxembourg was ranked as having the 25th most competitive financial center in the world, and third most competitive in Europe after London and Zürich. The country has specialised in the cross-border fund administration business. As Luxembourg's domestic market is relatively small, the country's financial centre is predominantly international. At the end of March 2009, there were 152 banks in Luxembourg, with over 27,000 employees. Political stability, good communications, easy access to other European centres, skilled multilingual staff, a tradition of banking secrecy and cross-border financial expertise have all contributed to the growth of the financial sector. These factors have contributed to a Corruption Perceptions Index of 8.3 and a DAW Index ranking of 10 in 2012; the latter the highest in Europe. Germany accounts for the largest-single grouping of banks, with Scandinavian, Japanese, and major US banks also heavily represented. Total assets exceeded €929 billion at the end of 2008. More than 9,000 holding companies are established in Luxembourg. The European Investment Bank—the financial institution of the European Union—is also located there.

Concern about Luxembourg's banking secrecy laws, and its reputation as a tax haven, led in April 2009 to it being added to a "grey list" of nations with questionable banking arrangements by the G20, a list from which it was removed in 2009. This concern has led Luxembourg to modify its tax legislation to avoid conflict with the tax authorities of European Union Members. For example, the classic tax exempt 1929 Holding Company was outlawed 31 December 2010, as it was deemed an illegal state aid by the European Commission.

Steel
A key event in the economic history of Luxembourg was the 1876 introduction of English metallurgy. The refining process led to the development of the steel industry in Luxembourg and founding of the Arbed company in 1911.

The restructuring of the industry and increasing government ownership in Arbed (31%) began as early as 1974. As a result of timely modernization of facilities, cutbacks in production and employment, government assumption of portions of Arbed's debt, and recent cyclical recovery of the international demand for steel, the company is again profitable. Its productivity is among the highest in the world. US markets account for about 6% of Arbed's output. The company specializes in production of large architectural steel beams and specialized value-added products. There has been, however, a relative decline in the steel sector, offset by Luxembourg's emergence as a financial center. In 2001, through the merger with Aceralia and Usinor, Arbed became Arcelor. Arcelor was taken over in 2006 by Mittal Steel to form Arcelor-Mittal, helmed by Lakshmi Mittal, the largest steel producer in the world.

Telecommunications

Government policies promote the development of Luxembourg as an audiovisual and communications center. Radio-Television-Luxembourg is Europe's premier private radio and television broadcaster. The government-backed Luxembourg satellite company "Société européenne des satellites" (SES) was created in 1986 to install and operate a satellite telecommunications system for transmission of television programs throughout Europe. The first SES Astra satellite, the 16-channel RCA 4000 Astra 1A, was launched by the Ariane Rocket in December 1988. SES presently constitutes the world largest satellite services company in terms of revenue.

Tourism

Tourism is an important component of the national economy, representing about 8.3% of GDP in 2009 and employing some 25,000 people or 11.7% of the working population. Despite the current crisis, the Grand Duchy still welcomes over 900,000 visitors a year who spend an average of 2.5 nights in hotels, hostels or on camping sites. Business travel is flourishing representing 44% of overnight stays in the country and 60% in the capital, up 11% and 25% between 2009 and 2010.

Agriculture
Luxembourg's small but productive agricultural sector is highly subsidized, mainly by the EU and the government. It employs about 1–3% of the work force. Most farmers are engaged in dairy and meat production. Vineyards in the Moselle Valley annually produce about 15 million litres of dry white wine, most of which is consumed within Luxembourg and also in Germany, France, and Belgium on a lesser scale.

Data 
The following table shows the main economic indicators in 1980–2017. Inflation under 2% is in green.

Accounting principles
Establishing accounts depends on the size of companies, and referring to three criteria: total of the balance sheet (total of assets without losses of the accounting year), the net amount of the turnover (net, such as it appears on the profit and loss account) and the average number of the workforce.

The control of medium and big companies must be made by one or several independent auditors of companies, appointed by the general assembly among the members of the Institute of Independent Auditors of Companies.
The control of small companies must be made by an accountant appointed by the general assembly for definite duration.
The conclusion of the independent auditor's report can be:
 A certificate without reserve, that is to say an approval
 A certificate with reserves, that is to say that there is approval with reserves because of discords or doubts
 A refusal to give a certificate

The accountants associations have difficulties getting organized because of the importance of the State in the accounting system.

Labour relations
Labour relations have been peaceful since the 1930s. Most industrial workers are organized by unions linked to one of the major political parties. Representatives of business, unions, and government participate in the conduct of major labour negotiations.

Foreign investors often cite Luxembourg's labour relations as a primary reason for locating in the Grand Duchy. Unemployment in 1999 averaged less than 2.8% of the workforce, but reached 4.4% by 2007.

 Energy 

In 1978, Luxembourg tried to build a 1,200 MW nuclear reactor but dropped the plans after threats of major protests.
Currently, Luxembourg uses imported oil and natural gas for the majority of its energy generation.

 Spaceflight and space resource extraction 

Luxembourg is a member of the European Space Agency
where Luxembourg contributed 23 million Euros in 2015.

The world's biggest satellite operator (SES Global) has its origin and headquarters in Betzdorf, Luxembourg.

In February 2016, the Government of Luxembourg announced that it would attempt to "jump-start an industrial sector to mine asteroid resources in space" by, among other things, creating a "legal framework" and regulatory incentives for companies involved in the industry.
By April 2017, three space mining corporations had established headquarters established in Luxembourg.

Luxembourg's new law took effect in August 2017, ensuring that private operators can be confident about their rights on resources they extract in space. The law provides that space resources can be owned by anyone, not just by Luxembourg citizens or companies."

Transportation

Luxembourg has efficient road, rail and air transport facilities and services. The road network has been significantly modernised in recent years with 147 km of motorways connecting the capital to adjacent countries. The advent of the high-speed TGV link to Paris has led to renovation of the city's railway station while a new passenger terminal at Luxembourg Airport has recently been opened. The airport has known a sustained growth in passenger numbers during the last years (2015: 2.7 mio, 2020 : 4 mio expected), and the second stage of expansion is on its way.

Trams have been reintroduced to the capital (first core line operative in end 2017) and further lines are planned, including a tram/light-rail to Esch-sur-Alzette. In 2019, almost all public transport was made free to use for both residents and visitors.

Prospects
According to a note from the Luxembourg statistical agency, the Luxembourg economy was set to grow 4.0% in 2011. The economic situation was particularly dynamic in late 2010 and early 2011 but there were signs of a slowdown, both in the international economic environment and in terms of national indicators. GDP growth was set to enter a recession in 2012.

See also
Economy of Europe
List of companies of Luxembourg
The Integrated Traffic and Landscape Concept for the Grand Duchy of Luxembourg
Social Welfare in Luxembourg
Luxembourg for Finance

References

 Further reading 
 
 
 
 Majerus, Benoît & Benjamin Zenner (2020) "Too small to be of interest, too large to grasp? Histories of the Luxembourg financial centre." European Review of History 
 
 
 

Notes

External links
 Economic Survey of Luxembourg 2012 from the Organisation for Economic Co-operation and Development (OECD)
 OECD general page on Luxembourg
 Government statistics 
 Luxembourg in The World Factbook''

 
Luxemburg
Luxembourg
Luxembourg